Benami Transactions (Prohibition) Act, 1988 (name changed to Prohibition of Benami Property Transactions Act, 1988 by section 3 of the 2016 amendment) is an Act of the Parliament of India that prohibits certain types of financial transactions. The act defines a 'benami' transaction as any transaction in which property is transferred to one person for consideration paid by another person. Such transactions were a feature of the Indian economy, usually relating to the purchase of property (real estate), and were thought to contribute to the Indian black money problem. The act bans all benami transactions and gives the government the right to recover property held benami without paying any compensation.

The act came into force on 5 September 1988. Although benami transactions are now illegal, the act had limited success in curbing them. Updated versions were therefore passed in 2011 and 2016, seeking to more comprehensively enforce the prohibitions.

Etymology
Benami is an Urdu word that means "without name" or "no name". In this Act, the word is used to define a transaction in which the real beneficiary is not the one in whose name the property is purchased. As a result, the person in whose name the property is purchased is just a mask of the real beneficiary.

Background
In 1973, the Law Commission of India after studying various Acts and prevailing benami system, recommended formulating an Act to tackle the issue. Accordingly, the Benami Transactions (Prohibition) Act, 1988 was enacted by the Parliament which came into force on 19 May 1988.

However, due to various deficiencies in the Act, the rules required for operationalizing the Act were not framed. To address these deficiencies, several years later, in 2011, the  Govt of India introduced "Benami Transactions (Prohibition) Bill, 2011".

Amendments
In an attempt to curb black money, in July 2016, Modi government decided to amend the original act which was subsequently passed by the Parliament of India as "The Benami Transactions (Prohibition) Amendment Act, 2016". Thereafter, the Government notified the provisions of the act to come into force from 1 November 2016. Mint newspaper reported that the Benami act along with the Black Money (Undisclosed Foreign Income and Assets) and Imposition of Tax Act, 2015, will help the Government in its fight against black money both within and outside the country. The 2016 Act also has safeguard mechanisms such as the adjudicating authority and the appellate mechanism for appeals.

The act "prohibits illegal benami transactions, and provides imprisonment up to seven years and fine for violation of the Act which may extend to 25% of the fair market value of the benami property."

Enforcement

Authorities
The Act establishes four authorities who will be able to conduct inquiries regarding benami transactions:

Results
Furthermore, the government has set up 24 Benami Prohibition Units (BPUs) across India for taking action under the Benami Act.

See also
 List of Acts of the Parliament of India

References

External links
 Text of the Benami Transactions (Prohibitions) Act, 1988

Taxation in India
Acts of the Parliament of India 1988
Anti-corruption measures in India
Modi administration